Naumburg-Roßbach station is a railway station in the Roßbach district in the town of Naumburg, located in the Burgenlandkreis district in Saxony-Anhalt, Germany.

References

Railway stations in Saxony-Anhalt
Buildings and structures in Burgenlandkreis
Railway stations in Germany opened in 2012